Gehyra is a genus of geckos in the family Gekkonidae. They are known as web-toed geckos or dtellas, and most species within the genus bear close resemblance to geckos from the genus Hemidactylus.

Geographic range
Gehyra species have a wide geographic range, covering most of the Oceania and Melanesian Islands as far north as the Ryukyu Islands and Thailand.

Description
Dtellas are moderately sized geckos that resemble house geckos. Gehyra species have toepads and powerful claws. Like some other geckos they also have a tendency to drop strips of skin if handled carelessly. Similar to house geckos, dtellas are able to communicate with clicks or chirps, although their chirp is often quieter than that of house geckos.

Species
The following species are recognized as being valid.
Gehyra angusticaudata  – narrow-tailed four-clawed gecko
Gehyra arnhemica  – East Arnhem land gehyra 
Gehyra australis   – top-end dtella
Gehyra baliola  – short-tailed dtella
Gehyra barea  – Banda Island dtella
Gehyra borroloola  – Borroloola dtella
Gehyra brevipalmata  – Palau Island dtella
Gehyra calcitectus  – relictual karst gehyra 
Gehyra capensis  – North West Cape gehyra 
Gehyra catenata  – chain-backed dtella
Gehyra chimera  – western Kimberley tree gehyra 
Gehyra crypta  – western cryptic gehyra 
Gehyra dubia  – dubious dtella
Gehyra einasleighensis  – Einasleigh rock dtella
Gehyra electrum  – amber rock dtella 
Gehyra fehlmanni  – Fehlmann's dtella
Gehyra fenestrula  – Hamersley Range spotted gehyra 
Gehyra finipunctata  – small-spotted midwest rock gehyra 
Gehyra gemina  – plain tree gehyra 
Gehyra georgpotthasti   
Gehyra girloorloo  – Kimberley karst gecko
Gehyra granulum  – Kimberley granular-toed gecko
Gehyra incognita  – northern Pilbara cryptic gehyra 
Gehyra insulensis  – Pacific stump-toed gecko
Gehyra interstitialis  – Oudemans's dtella
Gehyra ipsa  – Bungle Bungle Ranges gehyra 
Gehyra kimberleyi  – Kimberley dtella
Gehyra koira  – banded rock dtella
Gehyra lacerata  – lacerated dtella
Gehyra lapistola  – Litchfield rock gehyra 
Gehyra lauta  – Gulf tree gehyra 
Gehyra lazelli 
Gehyra leopoldi  – Leopold dtella
Gehyra macra  – large Pilbara rock gehyra
Gehyra marginata  – Halmahera giant gecko, Ternate dtella
Gehyra media  – medium Pilbara spotted rock gehyra
Gehyra membranacruralis  – Port Moresby dtella
Gehyra micra  – small Pilbara spotted rock gehyra
Gehyra minuta  – dwarf dtella
Gehyra montium  – Centralian dtella
Gehyra moritzi 
Gehyra multiporosa 
Gehyra mutilata  – common four-clawed gecko, stump-toed gecko
Gehyra nana  – northern spotted rock dtella
Gehyra occidentalis  – Kimberley Plateau dtella
Gehyra oceanica  – Pacific dtella
Gehyra ocellata  – Pilbara island gehyra 
Gehyra pamela  – Arnhemland watercourse dtella
Gehyra papuana  – Papua dtella
Gehyra paranana  – Litchfield spotted gecko 
Gehyra peninsularis  – Burrup Peninsula rock gehyra
Gehyra pilbara  – Pilbara dtella
Gehyra pluraporosa  – northern Kimberley gecko
Gehyra polka  – large-spotted midwest rock gehyra
Gehyra pseudopunctata  – southern Kimberley spotted gecko 
Gehyra pulingka 
Gehyra punctata  – spotted dtella
Gehyra purpurascens  – purplish dtella
Gehyra robusta  – robust dtella
Gehyra rohan 
Gehyra serraticauda 
Gehyra spheniscus  – small wedge-toed gecko
Gehyra unguiculata  – crescent-marked Pilbara gehyra
Gehyra variegata  – tree dtella
Gehyra versicolor 
Gehyra vorax  – voracious dtella
Gehyra wongchan 
Gehyra xenopus  – crocodile-faced dtella

Nota bene: A binomial authority in parentheses indicates that the species was originally described in a genus other than Gehyra.

References

Further reading
Boulenger GA (1885). Catalogue of the Lizards in the British Museum (Natural History). Second Edition. Volume I. Geckonidæ .... London: Trustees of the British Museum (Natural History). (Taylor and Francis, printers). xii + 436 pp. + Plates I-XXXII. (Genus Gehyra, p. 147).
Gray JE (1834). "Characters of Two New Genera of Reptiles (Geoemyda and Gehyra)". Proceedings of the Zoological Society of London 1834: 99-100. (Gehyra, new genus, p. 100). (in Latin and English).

Smith MA (1935). The Fauna of British India, Including Ceylon and Burma. Reptilia and Amphibia. Vol. II.—Sauria. London: Secretary of State for India in Council. (Taylor and Francis, printers). xiii + 440 pp. + Plate I + 2 maps. (Genus Gehyra, p. 104, Figure 30).

 
Lizard genera
Taxa named by John Edward Gray